Emphytoecia lineolata is a species of beetle in the family Cerambycidae. It was described by Blanchard in Gay, in 1851. It is known from Chile.

References

Pteropliini
Beetles described in 1851
Endemic fauna of Chile